Dulcinea is a 1963 Spanish drama film directed by Vicente Escrivá, and based on the play by Gaston Baty. It stars Millie Perkins, Cameron Mitchell and Folco Lulli.

It won the 1963 Best Film CEC Award at Spain's Cinema Writers Circle Awards, and was selected as the Spanish entry for the Best Foreign Language Film at the 35th Academy Awards, but was not accepted as a nominee.

Cast
 Millie Perkins as Aldonza / Dulcinea
 Folco Lulli as Sancho Panza
 Cameron Mitchell as El Renegado
 Walter Santesso as Diego (as Walter Santeso)
 Vittoria Prada as Blanca (as Victoria Prada)
 Pepe Rubio as Inquisidor (as José Rubio)
 Andrés Mejuto
 Antonio Garisa
 Hans Söhnker
 Ana María Noé as Mujer enferma
 José Guardiola as Testigo en juicio
 Antonio Ferrandis as Mendigo

See also
 List of submissions to the 35th Academy Awards for Best Foreign Language Film
 List of Spanish submissions for the Academy Award for Best Foreign Language Film

References

External links
 
 

1963 films
1960s Spanish-language films
English-language Spanish films
1963 drama films
Spanish films based on plays
Films based on Don Quixote
Spanish black-and-white films
Films directed by Vicente Escrivá
Films set in the 1600s
Films scored by Giovanni Fusco
1960s Spanish films